Hannah Alper (born ) is a Canadian activist, blogger, and journalist who was active in those fields before her teens.

Personal life
In 2013, her mother worked "helping children in their community through social programs and summer camps and music therapy" and her father worked for eOne Music Canada while founding a charity to buy hearing aids for children in need. In 2020 the family was living in the Toronto suburb of Richmond Hill, Ontario.

Activism

In July 2012, Alper launched her blog—Call Me Hannah—where she spoke about causes important to her: animal welfare, habitat destruction, and the natural environment; within the year, her blog had received 100,000 page-views.  By 2020 she had expanded her advocacy to anti-bullying and "kindraising", what she described as "changing our communities and the world through kindness."  At the same time, her blog had "a huge following", accumulated 40000 Twitter followers, 13000 Instagram followers, and earned her an interview by George Stroumboulopoulos.

Alper has given a motivational speech for ME to WE, served as an ambassador for Free the Children, spoken at the World Wildlife Fund's Toronto event for Earth Hour, and raised  (in pennies) from schoolchildren for Free the Children.  Her 2014 TEDx talk, "How to find your spark", was viewed over 2400 times in less than one week.  Nominated by Lilly Singh in 2017, Alper was the only teenager of Bloomberg Businessweek 19 people to watch in 2018.  By mid-2020, she had given "more than 400 speeches", and was elected co-president of the B'nai B'rith Youth Organization's Lake Ontario Region chapter.

Journalism
As a teen journalist, Alper has written for The Huffington Post and interviewed Malala Yousafzai, Craig Kielburger, Spencer West, Jian Ghomeshi and Severn Cullis-Suzuki.  In 2013, Alper was the official blogger for the Juno Awards.  Released on 1 November 2017, Alper's first book—Momentus: Small Acts, Big Change— is a collection of interviews with 19 of her role models (including Singh, Yousafzai, and Lily Collins), hoping to empower youth to take action and make the changes they want to see in the world.  2020 saw Alper feature in the pilot episode of CitizenKids: Earth Comes First, a TV series adapted from the Kids Can Press series of CitizenKid books; she, Cooper Price, Charlene Rocha, and series star Sophia Mathur "set out to tackle climate change issues from the perspective of today’s youth."

References

Further reading

External links
 
 

2000s births
21st-century Canadian Jews
21st-century Canadian journalists
21st-century Canadian non-fiction writers
activists from Toronto
Canadian bloggers
Canadian women activists
Canadian women bloggers
Canadian women journalists
environmental bloggers
environmental journalists
Jewish Canadian activists
Jewish Canadian journalists
journalists from Toronto
living people
people from Richmond Hill, Ontario
youth climate activists
writers from Toronto